German rapper Kollegah has received various awards and nominations for his work in each of the previously aforementioned fields. He rose to prominence in the 2010s, earning several honors for his work as a rapper.

Awards and nominations

Webvideopreis Deutschland

!
|-
| rowspan="3" | 2014
| rowspan="2" | "Armageddon"
| AAA
| 
| rowspan="3" style="text-align:center;"| 
|-
| Epic
| 
|-
| "Freuet euch, der Boss ist da auf"
| Newbie
| 
|-
| 2017
|Original Song
| Kollegah
| 
| style="text-align:center;"| 
|}

Juice Awards

!
|-
| 2008
| Kollegah
| Newcomer National
| 
| style="text-align:center;"|
|-
| rowspan="2" |2009
| Zuhältertape Volume 3
| Album National
| 
| rowspan="2" style="text-align:center;"|
|-
| Kollegah
| Künstler National
| 
|}

References 

Kollegah
Awards